HD 34968 is a binary star system in the southern constellation Lepus. The combined apparent visual magnitude of 4.69 is bright enough to be visible to the naked eye. It is moving further away from the Earth with a heliocentric radial velocity of 31 km/s, having come within  some 3,686,000 years ago.

The primary member, component A, is a magnitude 4.73 star. Houk and Smith-Moore (1978) gave this object a stellar classification of A0 V, indicating it is an ordinary A-type main-sequence star. Gray and Garrison (1987) classified it as B9.5 III and noted that the spectrum is slightly variable. The star is spinning with a projected rotational velocity of 84 km/s. It is radiating 245 times the Sun's luminosity from its photosphere at an effective temperature of 10,046 

The fainter secondary, component B, is a magnitude 8.45 star at an angular separation of  along a position angle of 279°, as of 2008.

References

A-type main-sequence stars
Binary stars
Lepus (constellation)
Durchmusterung objects
034968
024927
1762